Xinchang County is a county in the east-central part of Zhejiang province, administratively under the municipal government of Shaoxing. 430,000 people live in Xinchang.

Administrative divisions
Subdistricts:
Yulin Subdistrict (羽林街道), Nanming Subdistrict (南明街道), Qixing Subdistrict (七星街道)

Towns:
Shaxi (沙溪镇), Ru'ao (儒岙镇), Huishan (回山镇), Chengtan (澄潭镇), Xiaojiang (小将镇), Jingling (镜岭镇), Meizhu (梅渚镇), Dashiju (大市聚镇)

Townships:
Shuangcai Township (双彩乡), Qiaoying Township (巧英乡), Dongming Township (东茗乡), Xinlin Township (新林乡), Chengnan Township (城南乡)

Climate

Toxic capsule town
The town of Ru'ao became synonymous with poison. The factories using industrial gelatin to make pills were closed soon after CCTV reported the scandal on April 15, 2012. A third of Ruao's 30,000 population is employed in the capsule industry.

Tourism
Xinchang is home to the Dafo Temple.

References

External links

 
County-level divisions of Zhejiang
Shaoxing